There have been two baronetcies created for persons with the surname Murphy, both in the Baronetage of the United Kingdom. Both creations are extinct.

The Murphy Baronetcy, of Altadore in the Parish of Booterstown in the County of Dublin, was created in the Baronetage of the United Kingdom on 9 October 1903 for Sir James Murphy. The title became extinct on his death in 1922.

The Murphy Baronetcy, of Wyckham in the Parish of Taney in the County of Dublin, was created in the Baronetage of the United Kingdom on 3 February 1912 for Michael Murphy. The title became extinct on the death of the second Baronet in 1963.

Murphy baronets, of Altadore (1903)
Sir James Joseph Murphy, 1st Baronet (1843–1922)

Murphy baronets, of Wyckham (1912)
Sir Michael Murphy, 1st Baronet (1845–1925)
Sir George Francis Murphy, 2nd Baronet (1881–1963)

References

Extinct baronetcies in the Baronetage of the United Kingdom